Iryna Pavlivna Movchan (born 26 June 1990 in Dnipropetrovsk) is a Ukrainian former competitive figure skater. She is the 2008 Crystal Skate of Romania champion and a two-time (2009, 2011) Ukrainian national champion. She qualified to the free skate at three ISU Championships — 2007 Europeans in Warsaw, Poland; 2009 Europeans in Helsinki, Finland; and 2011 Worlds in Moscow, Russia.

Programs

Competitive highlights
JGP: Junior Grand Prix

References

External links 

 

Ukrainian female single skaters
1990 births
Living people
Sportspeople from Dnipro
Competitors at the 2011 Winter Universiade